Owanto (born December 13, 1953 in Paris) is a British Gabonese artist.

Biography
Owanto was born on December 13, 1953 in Paris, and spent her adolescence in Libreville, Gabon, where she spent her formative years, later moving to Madrid and studying at the Institut Catholic de Paris

In 2009, Owanto represented the Republic of Gabon at the 53rd Venice Biennale with her piece  The Lighthouse of Memory/ Go Nogé Mènè, curated by Fernando Francès, being the first Central African artist to exhibit solo in a National Pavilion. Owanto stated that the piece was inspired by an artistic proposal she called “Où Allons Nous?” (Where Are We Going?). Owanto also states that; "Gabon was looking for new directions, as was the rest of the world - new systems, new models of society, new ways of seeing.”

Work 
Owanto's work has focused on many themes, including consciousness, memory, cross-cultural existential dialogues, among others. Owanto’s current projects focus on women’s liberation, resilience, healing, and transformation.

Owanto’s art has entered into pop, conceptual and minimal genres in both her statuary work and others

Accolades 
Owanto won the Mbokodo Award in 2020. “The awards honor women who have strengthened communities and individuals through their art.”

Exhibitions 

2009: “The Lighthouse of Memory/ Go Nogé Mènè” Venice Biennale, Venice, Italy

2011: "El Faro de la Memoria" Galería Maior, Vigo, Spain

2012: "Où Allons Nous?" Voice Gallery, Marrakech, Morocco

2013: "Protect" Jardins de Saint Martin, Monaco

2014: "Here, Now." Biennale de Marrakech, Marrakech, Morocco

2015: Owanto " L'Atelier de l'artiste" Art Marbella, Galeria Yusto-Giner, Marbella, Spain

2016: "Flowers" Conseil National, Monaco

2018: "Dance with Me" African Artists Foundation, Lagos, Nigeria

2018: "Flowers" Voice Gallery, Marrakech, Morocco

2019: "One Thousand Voices" Museo d'Arte Contemporanea Donnaregina (MADRE), Naples, Italy

2019: "One Thousand Voices" Zeitz Museum of Contemporary Art Africa (Z-MOCAA), Cape Town, South Africa

2020: "Flowers" Sakhile&Me, Frankfurt, Germany

2020: "La Bible de ma Mère" LagosPhoto20, Online Home Museum

Group Exhibits 
2016: "Made in Spain. Periplo por el arte español de hoy" MAD Antequera, Málaga, Spain

2016: "Beauty" Centro de Exposiciones de Benalmádena, Benalmádena, Spain; MAD Antequera, Málaga, Spain

2016: "Group Presentation" 1:54 Contemporary African Art Fair London (Voice Gallery), London, UK

2017: "All Things Being Equal..." Zeitz Museum of Contemporary Art Africa (Z-MOCAA), Cape Town, South Africa

2017: "Group Presentation" 1:54 Contemporary African Art Fair London (Voice Gallery), London, UK

2017: "Group Presentation" Also Known As Africa Art Fair (AKAAAF), Paris, France

2017: "Group Presentation" LagosPhoto, Lagos, Nigeria

2018: "Group Presentation" 1:54 Contemporary African Art Fair London (Voice Gallery), London, UK

2018: "Our Anthropocene: Eco Crises" The Center for Book Arts, New York City, USA

2019: "Material Insanity" Museum of African Contemporary Art Al Maaden (MACAAL), Marrakech, Morocco

2020: "Group Show" 1-54 Contemporary African Art Fair (Sakhile&Me), London, UK

References 

 Thelma Mort (2020): Getting out of forgotten: The disruptive vision of Owanto, Agenda, DOI: 10.1080/10130950.2020.1833512  
 Berrada, Meriem; Dieudji, Janine G.; Diagne, Souleymane B. and Zineb A. Arraki. 2019. Material Insanity. Casablanca, Morocco: Somadi. .
 DeSouza, Allan; Milbourne, Karen; Mutu, Wangechi; Osodi, George and Clive van den Berg. 2013. Earth Matters: Land as Material and Metaphor in the Arts of Africa. New York, USA: Monacelli Press. .
 Frances, Fernando. 2009. Owanto: The Lighthouse of Memory - Go Nogé Mènè. Imola, Italy: Maretti Editore. .
 Sherman, Louise. 2002. Owanto. Barcelona, Spain: Polígrafa. .
 "Owanto: A Thousand Voices, But Two Thousand Feet" by Valentine Umansky, ART AFRICA, July 2020
 "Owanto: 30 years of militantisme en faveur de l'émancipation de la femme" by Stevie Mounombou, Gabonreview, July 2020
 "Owanto: An artist who asks you to look and reflect" by Emilie Gambade, Daily Maverick, July 2020
 "Something Terrible Happened To Me When I Was Seven", ELLE, February 2019
 "Le dire avec des fleurs", Diptyk n ° 47, February-March 2019
 "Fleurs guérisseuses et voix briseuses de silences", Afrique in visu, February 2019
 "Les Fleurs du Bien", ELLE, February 2018
 "Fleurs et Blessures - Entretien avec Owanto", IAM (Intense Art Magazine), January 2018
 "Owanto's Flower Series", AFRICANAH, December 2017
 "The Forgotten Drawer," ART AFRICA, December 2017
Fernando Francés, Owanto The Lighthouse of Memory Go Nogé Mènè, Christian Maretti Editore, 2009, pp 12–13.

Footnotes

External links 

 https://zeitzmocaa.museum/artists/owanto-berger/
 https://www.1-54.com/london/artists/owanto/

1953 births
French artists
French people of Gabonese descent
Gabonese artists
Living people
Gabonese activists